In mathematics, the Carlitz exponential is a characteristic p analogue to the usual exponential function studied in real and complex analysis. It is used in the definition of the Carlitz module – an example of a Drinfeld module.

Definition

We work over the polynomial ring Fq[T] of one variable over a finite field Fq with q elements. The completion C∞ of an algebraic closure of the field Fq((T−1)) of formal Laurent series in T−1 will be useful. It is a complete and algebraically closed field.

First we need analogues to the factorials, which appear in the definition of the usual exponential function. For i > 0 we define

and D0 := 1. Note that the usual factorial is inappropriate here, since n! vanishes in Fq[T] unless n is smaller than the characteristic of Fq[T].

Using this we define the Carlitz exponential eC:C∞ → C∞ by the convergent sum

Relation to the Carlitz module

The Carlitz exponential satisfies the functional equation

where we may view   as the power of  map or as an element of the ring  of noncommutative polynomials. By the universal property of polynomial rings in one variable this extends to a ring homomorphism ψ:Fq[T]→C∞{τ}, defining a Drinfeld Fq[T]-module over C∞{τ}. It is called the Carlitz module.

References

Algebraic number theory
Finite fields